Plagiobothrys jonesii is a species of flowering plant in the borage family known by the common name Mojave popcornflower. It is native to the southwestern United States and northern Mexico, where it grows in desert mountains and flats in scrub and woodland habitat.

Description
Plagiobothrys jonesii is an annual herb growing mostly upright or erect, approaching a maximum height near 40 centimeters. It is hairy in texture, the hairs rough, sharp, and bristly. The leaves alternately arranged along the stem are up to 10 centimeters long. The inflorescence is a series of tiny white flowers each 1 to 3 millimeters wide. The fruit is a tiny bumpy nutlet borne in clusters of 3 or 4.

External links
Jepson Manual Treatment: Plagiobothrys jonesii
Plagiobothrys jonesii Photo gallery

jonesii
Flora of the California desert regions
Flora of the Sonoran Deserts
Flora of Northwestern Mexico
Flora of the Southwestern United States